Mount Emma is a  mountain summit located in San Miguel County of Colorado, United States. It is situated three miles north of the community of Telluride, on the south side of Yankee Boy Basin, in the Uncompahgre National Forest. It is part of the Sneffels Range which is a subset of the San Juan Mountains, which in turn is part of the Rocky Mountains. Mount Emma is situated west of the Continental Divide, two miles south of Mount Sneffels, and 0.8 mile south of Gilpin Peak, the nearest higher neighbor. Emma ranks as the 197th-highest peak in Colorado, and the 10th-highest in the Sneffels Range. An ascent of Mt. Emma is a difficult climb with 2,180 feet of elevation gain covering three miles from Yankee Boy Basin, or 4,836 feet of elevation gain from Telluride. This mountain's name was officially adopted by the U.S. Board on Geographic Names.

Climate 
According to the Köppen climate classification system, Mount Emma is located in an alpine subarctic climate zone with long, cold, snowy winters, and cool to warm summers. Due to its altitude, it receives precipitation all year, as snow in winter, and as thunderstorms in summer, with a dry period in late spring. Precipitation runoff from the mountain drains into tributaries of the San Miguel River.

Gallery

See also

References

External links 

 Weather forecast: Mount Emma
 Emma Woodruff Hayden: Findagrave.com

Mountains of San Miguel County, Colorado
San Juan Mountains (Colorado)
Mountains of Colorado
North American 4000 m summits
Uncompahgre National Forest